The Republic of Logone, also known as Dar al-Kuti, was a partially-realized, self-declared autonomous region and proto-state internationally recognised as part of the Central African Republic. It was formed by the Muslim rebel movement Popular Front for the Rebirth of Central African Republic (FPRC) with support of other armed groups on 14 December 2015.

History 

In March 2013, during the Central African Republic Civil War which began a year earlier, the Muslim Séléka rebels forced the Christian president of the Central African Republic François Bozizé from his office, resulting in violence from the Christian anti-balaka militias. The UN sent in MINUSCA troops and scheduled a constitutional referendum for 13 December 2015 and national elections on 27 December in order to stabilize the country. However, Noureddine Adam, the leader of the Popular Front for the Rebirth of Central African Republic (FPRC), one of the four Muslim Séléka militias, abstained from the scheduled elections. In his view, Muslims and Christians could no longer live together in one country. On 14 December 2015, Adam's spokesman, Maouloud Moussa, declared the autonomous Republic of Logone in the northeast of the country. He explained that they wanted first to achieve autonomy within the Central African Republic and eventually absolute independence. Later, it was announced that the name of the new republic would be "Dar al-Kuti" after the historic Dar al-Kuti sultanate.

Louisa Lombard, a professor of anthropology at the Yale University, explained that it is possible that declaration of a new republic was a negotiating tactic for upcoming elections or a method for increasing influence, and that the rebels did not really believe that it is feasible to create a new state.

Besides FPRC the independence of Republic of Logone has been supported by MPC, RPRC and MLCJ armed groups.

On 10 April 2021 Kaga-Bandoro was recaptured by government forces.

References 

Central African Republic Civil War
Logone